Stlengis is a genus of marine ray-finned fishes belonging to the family Cottidae, the typical sculpins. These fishes are found in the northwestern Pacific Ocean where they are only known from the waters around Japan.

Taxonomy
Stlengis was first proposed as a monospecific genus in 1904 by the American ichthyologists David Starr Jordan and Edwin Chapin Starks when they described Stlengis osensis off Ose Point in Suruga Bay, Japan. The 5th edition of Fishes of the World classifies the genus Stlengis within the subfamily Cottinae of the family Cottidae, however, other authors classify the genus within the subfamily Oligocottinae of the family Psychrolutidae.

Species
There are currently three recognized species in this genus:

References

Cottinae
Fish of Japan
Marine fish genera
Taxa named by David Starr Jordan
Taxa named by Edwin Chapin Starks